Zhang Yufei may refer to:

 Zhang Yufei (gymnast) (born 1988), Chinese gymnast
 Zhang Yufei (swimmer) (born 1998), Chinese swimmer